Yantra is a village in Northern Bulgaria. The village is located in Gorna Oryahovitsa Municipality, Veliko Tarnovo Province. Аccording to the 2020 Bulgarian census, Yantra has a population of 604 people with a permanent address registration in the settlement.

Geography 
The majority of Yantra village's land area is covered by agricultural territories with 82%. 11% of the territories are urbanized areas, 3% water masses, and 2% forests.

The main livelihood of the local population is animal husbandry, followed by agricultural activities.

The elevation in the village varies between 50 and 99 meters with an average of 59 meters.

Culture 
The old name of the village was Murgazli. In 1934, it was renamed to its current name - Yantra. Archeological finds from antiquity and the Iron Age were found near the village.

Buildings 

 In 1868, the village's school was established.
 In 1923, the villagers built the community hall and library "Probuda".
 The church was built in the early 19th century and later rebuilt in 1937.

Ethnicity 
According to the Bulgarian population census in 2011:

References 

Villages in Veliko Tarnovo Province